Anzor Kavteladze (born 22 July 1969 in Chiatura) is a professional Georgian football midfielder.

Club career
Kavteladze, started his career with the club of Chiatura in Georgia. In 1993 he moved to Desna Chernihiv in Ukraine where he played 18 games. Then he played for Vorskla Poltava and then returned to Desna Chernihiv where he played 5 matches and scored 1 goal. In 1994 he moved to Kremin Kremenchuk, then in Elektron Romny in Hoverla Uzhhorod. In 1996 he moved again to Elektron Romny then in Dnipro Cherkasy. In 1997 he moved again to Chiatura where he played 27 games and scored 2 goals. In 1998 he moved to Guria Lanchkhuti and then in Chiatura. In 2000 he returned to Ukraine with Nizhny.

References

External links
Profile on website 
Profile on website 

1992 births
Living people
Sportspeople from Georgia (country)
Sportsmen from Georgia (country)
FC Desna Chernihiv players
FC Vorskla Poltava players
FC Kremin Kremenchuk players
FC Elektron Romny players
FC Hoverla Uzhhorod players
FC Dnipro Cherkasy players
FC Guria Lanchkhuti players
Footballers from Georgia (country)
Expatriate footballers from Georgia (country)
Expatriate footballers in Ukraine
Expatriate sportspeople from Georgia (country) in Ukraine
Association football defenders